Pellumbesha Gjyli (born 31 August 1986) is an Albanian footballer who plays as a goalkeeper. She has been a member of the Albania women's national team.

See also
List of Albania women's international footballers

References

1986 births
Living people
Women's association football goalkeepers
Albanian women's footballers
Albania women's international footballers